Events from the year 1898 in Sweden

Incumbents
 Monarch – Oscar II
 Prime Minister – Erik Gustaf Boström

Events

 7 August - Swedish Trade Union Confederation (LO) is founded
 Replaced the Social Democratic Labor Party (SAP) acting as the trade union movement's central organization
 Brand (magazine)
 Sollefteå GIF
 Team ThorenGruppen Fotboll
 IFK Västerås
 Christian Workers Union of Sweden (1898) founded
 internal combustion engine built for Vabis
 production of Swedish Mauser commenced
 'third veto' marked a stage of Norway's withdrawal of use of union mark in its flags
 construction of Tjolöholm Castle commenced
 Princess Margaret of Connaught confirmed in Windsor Castle
 founding of Soltorgsgymnasiet gymnasium (school)
 Högby Lighthouse first constructed
 First Swedish military aircraft entered service
 Sollefteå GIF association football club founded
 Tegs SK (ice hockey) founded
 Orrefors glassworks founded

Births

 15 January - Erik Byléhn, athlete (died 1986)
 22 January - Thor Modéen, actor (died 1950)
 28 January - Erik Abrahamsson, athlete (died 1965)
 24 February - Baltzar von Platen, inventor (died 1984)
 19 April - Eric Persson, football manager (died 1984)
 30 April - Johan Richthoff, wrestler (died 1983)
 16 May - Nils Swedlund, soldier (died 1965)
 29 June - Bertil Jansson, athlete (died 1981)
 6 July - Richard Åkerman, soldier (died 1981)
 10 July - Renée Björling, actor (died 1975)
 23 July - Bengt Djurberg, actor (died 1941)
 16 August - Gregor Adlercreutz, equestrian (died 1944)
 20 August - Vilhelm Moberg, man of letters (died 1973)
 4 November - Nils Engdahl, athlete (died 1983)
 9 December - Astri Taube, artist (died 1980)
 11 December - Nils Ferlin, poet (died 1961)
 28 December - Carl-Gustaf Rossby, meteorologist (1957)

Deaths

 10 December - Emil Kléen, poet (born 1868)
 8 December Ellen Anckarsvärd, women's right activist (born 1833)
 4 July – Rosalie Roos, women's right activist and writer (born 1823)

References

 
Years of the 19th century in Sweden
Sweden